Talageh-ye Olya or Talagah-e Olya may refer to:
 Talagah-e Olya, Kohgiluyeh and Boyer-Ahmad